Elizabeth Carina Copes (born October 4, 1976 in La Plata) is an Argentine judoka, who competed in the women's middleweight category. She held a 2002 Argentine senior title for her own division, picked up a total of thirteen medals in her career, and also represented her nation Argentina at the 2004 Summer Olympics.

Copes qualified for the Argentine squad in the women's middleweight class (70 kg) at the 2004 Summer Olympics in Athens, by placing second and receiving a berth from the Pan American Championships in Margarita Island, Venezuela. She overwhelmed Greece's Alexia Kourtelesi in front of the massive home crowd for a victory in the opening match, before falling short to Dutch judoka and eventual silver medalist Edith Bosch, who scored an ippon and tightly wrapped her with an uchi mata makikomi fashion at one minute and nine seconds. In the repechage round, Copes gave herself a chance for an Olympic bronze medal, but her powerful grips were not enough to throw and Spain's Cecilia Blanco into the tatami with an ippon seoi nage (one-arm shoulder throw) during their first playoff.

References

External links

1976 births
Living people
Argentine female judoka
Olympic judoka of Argentina
Judoka at the 2004 Summer Olympics
Judoka at the 2003 Pan American Games
Sportspeople from La Plata
Pan American Games competitors for Argentina
20th-century Argentine women
21st-century Argentine women